The Buenos Aires Grand Prix, (also known as the Premio Ciudad de Buenos Aires) was a Formula Libre handicap race, organized by the ACA (Automóvil Club Argentino) and held at the Retiro Circuit on 23 November 1941.

Entries were open for the national mechanic "Mecánica Nacional" class, based on series cars (Ford, Chevrolet, Hudson) and the "Coches Especiales" Grand Prix cars. Racing started with a preliminary Mecánica Nacional class elimination round (best five qualifying for the GP) which was won by Mario P. Chiozza (Bi-Motor Mercury). The class group received a one-minute handicap at the start of the GP main event.

The GP class included Riganti's new Maserati 8CL (chassis 3034) that was entered in the 1940 Indianapolis.

Classification

References

Buenos Aires Grand Prix
Buenos Aires Grand Prix
Buenos Aires Grand Prix